John Frawley (18 August 1929 – 3 March 1999, in Melbourne, Australia) was an Australian actor with a number of film, television and stage credits to his name.  After a television career in the United Kingdom during the 1960s, which included episodes of The Prisoner and The Avengers, Frawley appeared mainly in Australian films during the 1970s.  He returned to television in the 1980s and 1990s, including appearances in Prisoner (a.k.a. Prisoner: Cell Block H) and Brides of Christ.

Selected filmography 

 Flynn (1996)
 Dallas Doll (1994)
 Call Me Mr. Brown (1990)
 Backstage (1988)
 The Humpty Dumpty Man (1986)
 Annie's Coming Out (1984)
 Harlequin (1980)
 The Timeless Land (1980)
 Blue Fin (1978)
 The Night, the Prowler (1978)
 The Last Wave (1977)
 Eliza Fraser (1976)
 The Trespassers (1976)
 The Devil's Playground (1976)
 The Great McCarthy (1975)

References

Books:
William K Halliwell, The Filmgoer's Guide to Australian Films, Angus & Robertson Publishers (1985)

External links
 

Australian male television actors
Australian male film actors
Australian male stage actors
Male actors from Melbourne
1999 deaths
1929 births
20th-century Australian male actors